is a railway station operated by the Keisei Electric Railway located in Chūō-ku, Chiba Japan. It is 11.7 kilometers from the terminus of the Keisei Chiba Line at Keisei-Tsudanuma Station.

History
Shin-Chiba Station was opened on 24 July 1923.

Station numbering was introduced to all Keisei Line stations on 17 July 2010; Shin-Chiba Station was assigned station number KS58.

Lines
Keisei Electric Railway
Keisei Chiba Line

Layout
Shin-Chiba Station has two elevated opposed side platforms with the station building underneath.

Platforms

External links
  Keisei Station layout

References

Railway stations in Japan opened in 1923
Railway stations in Chiba Prefecture